Alessandro Schienoni (26 November 1902 – 11 February 1969) was an Italian professional footballer who played as a defender.

External links 
Profile at MagliaRossonera.it 

1902 births
1969 deaths
Italian footballers
Association football defenders
Serie A players
A.C. Milan players
Vigevano Calcio players